S J Samuel was the second  Bishop of Coimbatore.

Notes

20th-century Anglican bishops in India
Indian bishops
Indian Christian religious leaders
Anglican bishops of Coimbatore